Symbiosis International School is an International Baccalaureate school located in Pune, India, founded in 2005. It offers students a 12-year education, starting with Early Years 1-3 Programme, IB Primary Years Programme (PYP), IB Middle Years Programme  (MYP),Cambridge IGCSE and IB Diploma Programme (DP). It is located in the north-east side of Pune city, in Viman Nagar. The school is built on a campus shared with Symbiosis International University. The two institutions share many facilities, such as a football pitch, basketball courts, first-aid facilities, and an amphitheatre.

The school is authorised by the [International Baccalaureate Organisation] to offer the IB Primary Years Programme, which is offered from kindergarten and grades I to V, and the IB Diploma Programme for grades XI and XII. SIS offers IB Middle Years Programme for grades VI through VIII, It is also a recognised centre for the International General Certificate of Secondary Education by Cambridge International Examinations, and students appear for IGCSE examinations at the end of grade X after a two-year preparation course beginning in grade IX.

See also 
List of schools in Pune

References

External links 
 

Cambridge schools in India
International Baccalaureate schools in India
Schools in Pune
2005 establishments in Maharashtra
Educational institutions established in 2005
Symbiosis Society